Melody Parade is a 1943 American musical film directed by Arthur Dreifuss and written by Tim Ryan and Charles R. Marion. The film stars Mary Beth Hughes, Eddie Quillan, Tim Ryan, Irene Ryan, Mantan Moreland, Jerry Cooper and Armida. The film was released on August 27, 1943, by Monogram Pictures.

Plot
A nightclub hatcheck girl seeks a singing career that she's always dreamed of.  A busboy at that nightclub attempts to help her achieve her dreams.

Cast          
Mary Beth Hughes as Anne O'Rourke
Eddie Quillan as Jimmy Tracy
Tim Ryan as Happy Harrington
Irene Ryan as Gloria Brewster
Mantan Moreland as Skidmore
Jerry Cooper as himself
Armida as herself
André Charlot as Carroll White
Kenneth Harlan as Jedson
Cyril Ring as Adams
Ramon Roz as Ramon Roz
Ruby Dandridge as Ruby
Anson Weeks as Orchestra Leader
Ted Fio Rito as Orchestra Leader

References

External links
 
 

1943 films
American musical films
1943 musical films
Monogram Pictures films
Films directed by Arthur Dreifuss
American black-and-white films
1940s English-language films
1940s American films